Central Park is a Regional Transportation District (RTD) commuter rail and bus station on the A Line in the Central Park neighborhood of Denver, Colorado. The station is the third eastbound station from Union Station in Downtown Denver and fourth westbound from Denver International Airport. The station is about 13 minutes from Downtown Denver and 24 minutes from Denver International Airport.

Central Park station is served by several TheRide bus routes and also has 1,500 parking spaces in a park-and-ride lot, the largest on the A Line.

History
The station is located near Smith Road and Central Park Boulevard in the redevelopment area of the decommissioned Stapleton International Airport. It replaced the Stapleton Park and Ride. The bus service to the station opened on September 13, 2015, replacing with bus canopies and paved lots, unlike the old area. Train service to the station on the A Line began on April 22, 2016.

See also
 Balloon Man Running

References

RTD commuter rail stations in Denver
2016 establishments in Colorado
Railway stations in the United States opened in 2016